Allen Bernstein may refer to:
Allen Irvin Bernstein (1913–2008), gay Jewish American World War II veteran and author
Roxy Bernstein (Allen "Roxy" Bernstein, born 1972), American sportscaster

See also
 Alan Bernstein (born 1947), President and CEO of the Canadian Institute for Advanced Research